C. sinuosa may refer to :
 Colpomenia sinuosa, a brown alga species
 Chama sinuosa, the smooth-edged jewel box, a bivalve mollusc species